Wade Simoneaux is a former head coach of the Louisiana Tech Bulldogs baseball team.  Before coming to Louisiana Tech for the 2003 season, he served as the hitting coach, recruiting coordinator, and infield coach for the Louisiana–Lafayette Ragin' Cajuns baseball team. He played third base for Nicholls State where he graduated in 1984. In 2014, Simoneaux moved to West Monroe High School in West Monroe, Louisiana.

Head coaching record

References

External links
Wade Simoneaux bio

Living people
College of Central Florida Patriots baseball players
Louisiana Tech Bulldogs baseball coaches
Louisiana Ragin' Cajuns baseball coaches
Nicholls Colonels baseball players
People from Gonzales, Louisiana
Year of birth missing (living people)
High school baseball coaches in the United States